Vysokovo is a rural locality (a village) in Lyakhovskoye Rural Settlement, Melenkovsky District, Vladimir Oblast, Russia. The population as of 2010, was 294. The rural locality has 4 known streets.

Geography 
Vysokovo is located 22 km east of Melenki (the district's administrative centre) by road. The nearest rural locality is Korikovo.

References 

Rural localities in Melenkovsky District
Melenkovsky Uyezd